The EMAAR-MGF Ladies Masters was a golf tournament on the Ladies European Tour. It was played at the Eagleton Golf Resort in Bidadi, India in 2007. The event was canceled in 2008 due to the global economic downturn.

Winners

References

Former Ladies European Tour events
Golf tournaments in India